The year 1549 in science and technology included some events, a few of which are listed here.

Births
 November 30 – Henry Savile, English polymath and benefactor (died 1622)
 Michiel Coignet, Flemish engineer, cosmographer, mathematician and scientific instrument-maker (died 1623)
 Nikola Vitov Gučetić, Ragusan polymath (died 1610)

Deaths
 April – Andrew Boorde, English physician and traveller (born 1490)
 August – Jacob Ziegler, German geographer (born c. 1470/1)

 
16th century in science
1540s in science